Ngoy Srin (  born 1 September 1994) is a former Cambodian footballer.

Phnom Penh Crown
In 2011, coming through the open trials and joining Phnom Penh Crown is a dream scenario for defender Ngoy Srin, who was born in Takeo but has lived in Koh Kong for many years. He represented his provincial team and signed his first contract as a professional player in December.

Nagaworld
In 2016, he signed a contract with Nagaworld alongside other 3 teammates, Sos Suhana, Sary Matnorotin, and Yok Ary.

International career
Srin made his international debut in a friendly match against Malaysia on 20 September 2014.

Honours

Club
Phnom Penh Crown
Cambodian League: 2014

References 

1994 births
Living people
Cambodian footballers
Cambodia international footballers
People from Takéo province
Association football defenders
Phnom Penh Crown FC players
Nagaworld FC players
21st-century Cambodian people